Filippo Timi (born 27 February 1974) is an Italian actor, director and writer.

Biography

Winner of ‘Best Actor under 30’ at the 2004 UBU Awards, the maximum prize for Italian theatre, onstage he has been Orpheus, Danton, Perceval, Cupid, Hamlet and Satan, playing three different roles in Henrik Ibsen's A Doll's House by Andrée Ruth Shammah in 2016.

Despite his stuttering and partial blindness he became a star of the big screen including a wide range of activities as author and entrepreneur for TV, cinema, theatre, magazines and musical shows; between 2006 and 2008 he published the best-seller trilogy Tuttalpiù muoio (At Worst I’ll die), E lasciamole cadere queste stelle (Let these stars fall) and Peggio che diventare famoso (Worse than becoming famous) in which he recalls his humble origins and transform youth troubles into a powerful and intense love for life, through a vividly ironic and phantasmagoric lens.

His 2009 Shakespeare adaptation Il popolo non ha il pane, diamogli le brioche (People don’t have bread, let's give them sweet rolls), written, directed and starring by him as Hamlet, was sold out for two years and legitimated his name as one of the most acclaimed and talented authors of Italian theatre.

His film career took off with roles in Ferzan Ozpetek's multiple award winning Saturn in Opposition and Saverio Costanzo's In Memory of Me, for which he was nominated for a best supporting actor award by the Italian Syndicate of Film Journalists. After taking the lead roles in Wilma Labate's Miss F and Giuliano Montaldo's The Demons of St. Petersberg with Isabella Rossellini, he won a Best Actor award for his leading role in Academy Award winner director Gabriele Salvatores's As God Commands.

Since 2009 Timi's films were in competition in major festivals: at Cannes with Vincere by Marco Bellocchio, where he played the young Benito Mussolini, and at the Venice International Film Festival with the debut of Giuseppe Capotondi, The Double Hour, winner of the Coppa Volpi. He played dramatic roles in Vallanzasca, Angel of Evil (2011), the period drama Rust (2011) alongside comedies like Asterix and Obelix: God Save Britannia (2012).

The actor completed his English-language debut, acting alongside George Clooney in Anton Corbijn's action film The American, and dubbing Tom Hardy's voice in the Italian release of The Dark Knight Rises. He also voiced Manny in the Italian dub of the last two films of the Ice Age franchise, replacing Leo Gullotta.

Personal life
Timi is openly gay. In 2016, he married his longtime boyfriend, the artist and writer Sebastiano Mauri, in a civil ceremony in New York City. They have since divorced.

Filmography

Films

Television

Selected plays
•	Fuoco centrale, by Cesare Ronconi (1995)
•	G.A. story, by Robert Wilson (1996)
•	La rabbia, study by Pippo Delbono (1996)
•	Medea, by Filippo Timi e Federica Santoro; produced by Giorgio Barberio Corsetti (1999)
•	F. di O., by Filippo Timi, produced by Giorgio Barberio Corsetti (1999)
•	La tempesta, by Giorgio Barberio Corsetti (1999)
•	Il Graal, by Giorgio Barberio Corsetti (2000)
•	Woyzeck, by Giorgio Barberio Corsetti (2001)
•	Il gabbiano, by Anton Milenin (2001)
•	La morte di Danton, by Aleksandr Popowski (2004)
•	La vita bestia, by Giorgio Barberio Corsetti (2006)
•	Il colore bianco, by Giorgio Barberio Corsetti (2006)
•	Il popolo non ha il pane? Diamogli le brioche, by Filippo Timi (2009)
•	Favola. C'era una volta una bambina, e dico c'era perché ora non c'è più, by Filippo Timi (2011)
•	Giuliett'e Romeo. M'engolfi 'l core, amore, by Filippo Timi (2011)
•	Il Don Giovanni: vivere è un abuso, mai un diritto, by Filippo Timi (2013)
•	Skianto, by Filippo Timi (2014)
•	Una casa di bambola, by Andrée Ruth Shammah, (2015–16)

References

External links 
 

1974 births
Living people
People from Perugia
Italian male film actors
Italian male television actors
Italian male stage actors
Italian gay actors
20th-century Italian male actors
21st-century Italian male actors
Italian film directors
Italian theatre directors
LGBT film directors
LGBT theatre directors
Italian male screenwriters
Italian LGBT screenwriters
Gay screenwriters
Italian gay writers
21st-century Italian male writers
21st-century Italian screenwriters
Italian male dramatists and playwrights
Italian LGBT dramatists and playwrights
Gay dramatists and playwrights
21st-century Italian dramatists and playwrights
20th-century Italian LGBT people
21st-century Italian LGBT people